David Locke may refer to:

 David Ross Locke (1833–1888), American journalist and political commentator
 David H. Locke (1927–2019), American politician in the Massachusetts General Court
 David Locke (swimmer) (born 1972), Australian swimmer

See also
 David Lock (born 1960), British barrister and former politician